André Renato Soares Martins (born 21 January 1990) is a Portuguese professional footballer who plays for Israeli Premier League club Hapoel Be'er Sheva as a central midfielder.

Formed at Sporting CP, where he made 103 total appearances, he won the Super League Greece at Olympiacos and two Ekstraklasa titles for Legia Warsaw.

Club career

Sporting CP
After graduating from Sporting CP's youth academy Martins was loaned out, along with six other former club juniors, to Real S.C. in the third division. For 2010–11, newly appointed coach Paulo Sérgio called him back for pre-season trainings, and, in August, he was sent to C.F. Os Belenenses in the Segunda Liga, in a season-long loan. However, after José Mota's arrival at the team's bench, the player was deemed surplus to requirements and another loan was arranged in January 2011, at third-tier side C.D. Pinhalnovense.

Mainly due to injuries to teammates, Martins featured in Sporting's bench in some matches in 2011–12. On 20 October 2011 he made his official debut for the Lions, coming on as a substitute for Diego Capel for the last 15 minutes of a 2–0 home win against FC Vaslui in the group stage of the UEFA Europa League.

Martins scored three goals in 29 competitive games in 2013–14 for the eventual vice-champions, his first in the Primeira Liga and overall coming on 15 September 2013 in a 2–0 away victory over S.C. Olhanense. Following the appointment of coach Jorge Jesus, however, he was told to look for a new club, and left the Estádio José Alvalade on 30 June 2016.

Olympiacos
On 8 August 2016, free agent Martins signed with six-time consecutive Super League Greece champions Olympiacos FC. In his first season, he contributed one goal from 29 appearances to another national championship conquest.

Martins featured much less the following campaign, and was deemed surplus to requirements after the arrival of his compatriot Pedro Martins as manager.

Legia Warsaw
On 6 September 2018, Martins joined Legia Warsaw on a 12-month contract with the option to extend it for another year. He won the Ekstraklasa title in two consecutive seasons, the latter time accompanied by compatriot Rafael Lopes in 2021.

During his spell at the Stadion Wojska Polskiego, Martins played 128 official matches and scored twice.

Hapoel Be'er Sheva
On 13 January 2022, Martins agreed to a one-and-a-half-year deal with Hapoel Be'er Sheva F.C. of the Israeli Premier League.

International career
Martins earned 43 caps for Portugal at youth level, including 17 for the under-21 team. On 10 June 2013 he made his debut for the full side, playing the dying minutes of the 1–0 friendly win over Croatia in Geneva. On 14 August, in another exhibition game, he replaced Rúben Amorim midway through the second half of a 1–1 draw against the Netherlands.

Career statistics

Honours
Sporting CP
Taça de Portugal: 2014–15

Olympiacos
Super League Greece: 2016–17

Legia Warsaw
Ekstraklasa: 2019–20, 2020–21

Hapoel Be'er Sheva
Israel State Cup: 2021–22
Israel Super Cup: 2022

References

External links

1990 births
Living people
Sportspeople from Santa Maria da Feira
Portuguese footballers
Association football midfielders
Primeira Liga players
Liga Portugal 2 players
Segunda Divisão players
Sporting CP footballers
Real S.C. players
C.F. Os Belenenses players
C.D. Pinhalnovense players
Sporting CP B players
Super League Greece players
Olympiacos F.C. players
Ekstraklasa players
Legia Warsaw players
Israeli Premier League players
Hapoel Be'er Sheva F.C. players
Portugal youth international footballers
Portugal under-21 international footballers
Portugal international footballers
Footballers at the 2016 Summer Olympics
Olympic footballers of Portugal
Portuguese expatriate footballers
Expatriate footballers in Greece
Expatriate footballers in Poland
Expatriate footballers in Israel
Portuguese expatriate sportspeople in Greece
Portuguese expatriate sportspeople in Poland
Portuguese expatriate sportspeople in Israel